Federal Correctional Institution (FCI), Coleman refers to either of two separate and distinct FCIs housing male offenders, namely Federal Correctional Institution, Coleman Low or Federal Correctional Institution, Coleman Medium. Both institutions form part of the Federal Correctional Complex (FCC) Coleman and are operated by the Federal Bureau of Prisons, a division of the United States Department of Justice.

FCC Coleman is located in central Florida approximately 50 miles northwest of Orlando, 60 miles northeast of Tampa, and 35 miles south of Ocala.

Notable incidents
In early 2000, federal investigators discovered that inmate Roy Ageloff was directing fraudulent activities from FCI Coleman. Ageloff, a former stockbroker, was convicted of money laundering in 1998 for masterminding a securities manipulation scheme in the 1990s which swindled thousands of investors out of millions of dollars. An investigation uncovered that Ageloff was continuing to give his co-conspirators, including his brother, instructions regarding the management, transfer, concealment and investment of proceeds from the scheme. Ageloff gave these instructions during prison visits, recorded telephone conversations, and through prison e-mail. Ageloff's co-conspirators continued to receive criminal proceeds in the form of cash payments and checks. In August 2000, Ageloff pleaded guilty to federal racketeering charges and was subsequently sentenced to 96 months in federal prison. Ageloff's brother, Michael Ageloff, pleaded guilty to money laundering and received a 48-month sentence in 2009.

Notable inmates

Current and former

See also

List of U.S. federal prisons
Federal Bureau of Prisons
Incarceration in the United States

References

Buildings and structures in Sumter County, Florida
Coleman
Coleman